Hope Crisp and Agnes Tuckey were the defending champions, but they lost in the semifinals to eventual champions James Cecil Parke and Ethel Larcombe.

Parke and Larcombe defeated Anthony Wilding and Marguerite Broquedis in the final, 4–6, 6–4, 6–2 to win the mixed doubles tennis title at the 1914 Wimbledon Championships.

Draw

Finals

Top half

Section 1

Section 2

Bottom half

Section 3

Section 4

References

External links

X=Mixed Doubles
Wimbledon Championship by year – Mixed doubles